Henry Ernest Hardy (later known as Father Andrew) (7 January 1869 – 31 March 1946) was a British Anglican clergyman and friar, who co-founded the Society of Divine Compassion to work with the poor in the East End of London.

Life
Hardy was born in Kasauli, India; his father was a colonel in the Indian army.  After growing up in India, he attended Clifton College and an art school in Bristol, before studying at Keble College, Oxford, where he obtained a fourth-class degree in theology in 1891.  While he was at Oxford, Arthur Winnington-Ingram (a Keble graduate who at the time was head of Oxford House in the East End of London, and later became Bishop of London) visited the university seeking volunteers to work with the poor. Hardy offered his services and moved to Oxford House in October 1891, where he combined administrative work with practical assistance to the needy.

In January 1894, his thoughts about combining a religious life and work with poor residents of London led him and two others (James Adderley and Henry Chappel) to found the Society of the Divine Compassion, taking religious vows of poverty, chastity and obedience and for his religious name: "Andrew".  Brother Andrew was ordained a priest, following studies at Ely Theological College.  The new society was then based in Plaistow, in the East End, and its members staffed St Philip's Church. Father Andrew was the last of the original three members of the community (Adderley left in 1897, and Chappel died in 1915) and was its central figure for many years, as well as acting as priest-in-charge of St Philip's from 1916 until his death, apart from a year spent on retreat in Southern Rhodesia.  He was highly regarded as a confessor, spiritual guide and religious writer. (A bishop described him as a great man, such as God sends only once or twice in a generation.)  He was also a talented painter. His health, which had troubled him for many years, worsened as a result of the strain imposed by the Second World War, which hit the East End severely – the church was bombed twice. He developed cancer, and died on 31 March 1946.

References

External links
Bibliography from Project Canterbury

1869 births
1946 deaths
People educated at Clifton College
Alumni of Keble College, Oxford
Alumni of Ely Theological College
20th-century English Anglican priests
People from Plaistow, Newham